The Olympos Aerial Tram, aka Olympos Cable Car, is an aerial lift of tramway type located in Antalya Province, southern Turkey, serving the peak of Mount Olympos ( at an altitude of  from Kemer. It went into service in 2006.

The aerial lift line was constructed by the Austrian Doppelmayr Garaventa Group. There are four supporting towers located between the two terminals. The aerial tram consists of two passenger cabins, each capable of carrying 80 passengers. Two fixed track cables are for support while one loop of cable, solidly connected to the cabins, is for haulage. An electric motor drives the haulage rope, which provides propulsion. When the cabins arrive at the end stations, the cable loop stops and reverses direction so that the cars shuttle back and forth between the terminals. 

The mountain station offers a panoramic view of the Mediterranean coast from Finike in the southwest and Side in the northeast, and features a restaurant and gift shops.

In case of a power supply cut, a hydrostatic emergency power system ensures safe continuation of operations. Passengers can be evacuated by ropes at locations where the cabin is not very high from the ground. Evacuation of passengers is also possible by small emergency cabins capable of carrying 25 people, or by helicopter in good weather.

Mt. Olympos is situated within the Beydağları Coastal National Park. The site offers trekking, mountain climbing and paragliding activities in the summer and skiing in the winter time.

Operation hours are everyday from 10 to 17 hours.

 Base station:  
 Mountain station:

See also
 Beydağları Coastal National Park

References

External links
 360° panoramic view in summer and winter at the peak of Mount Olympos

Aerial tramways in Turkey
Transport in Antalya
Tourist attractions in Antalya Province
Kemer District
2006 establishments in Turkey